Zidasht (also Romanized as Zīdasht and Zaidasht) is a village in Miyan Taleqan Rural District of the Central District of Taleqan County, Alborz province, Iran. At the 2006 census, its population was 733 in 231 households. The latest census in 2016 counted 816 people in 295 households; it is the largest village in its rural district.

References 

Taleqan County

Populated places in Alborz Province

Populated places in Taleqan County